The Ecumenical Centre in Geneva, Switzerland, is located in the vicinity of the International Labour Organization, International Red Cross and Red Crescent Movement, and the World Health Organization and serves as the base for the following church organizations:

ACT Alliance
Ecumenical Church Loan Fund
Lutheran World Federation
World Student Christian Federation
World Council of Churches

It formerly also served as the headquarters of:
Conference of European Churches, now based in Brussels
Ecumenical News International, now defunct
World Communion of Reformed Churches, seat since 2014 in Hannover, Germany

See also 
 The Interchurch Center, another building complex for multiple religious organizations in New York City

External links
 

Buildings and structures in Geneva
Christian ecumenical organizations
Tourist attractions in Geneva